The Ministry of Planning (MoP) is a government ministry responsible for socioeconomic planning and statistics management in Cambodia.  The Ministry consists of two main parts; the General Directorate of Planning, and the National Institute of Statistics.  The Ministry is located in Phnom Penh.

See also
 Census
 Demographics
 Government of Cambodia

References

External links
 Ministry of Planning homepage
 National Institute of Statistics

Planning
Phnom Penh
Cambodia